Tsai Chen-chou (13 September 1946 – 14 May 1987) was a Taiwanese politician and businessman.

The family was known outside of politics for their wealth.

When the Tsai family chose to split their holdings in 1979, Tsai Chen-chou assumed control of Cathay Plastics Group. Tsai Chen-chou also led the Tenth Credit Cooperative, which had previously belonged to his uncle Tsai Wan-lin. He was elected to the Legislative Yuan as a Kuomintang representative of Taipei in December 1983. After taking office, Tsai Chen-chou and Wang Jin-pyng, among other legislators, founded the Thirteen Brotherhood Club. This group sought to make revisions to the Banking Law so that investment trust companies could be transformed into banks. A  broke in 1985, after bank runs had occurred at Tenth Credit Cooperative and Cathay Investment and Trust Company. The club disbanded after Tsai was arrested and charged with fraud. It was discovered that Tsai had acquired loans in other people's names, transferred deposits at Tenth Cooperative to CPG, and failed to pay wages to CGP employees. Despite his affiliation with the ruling party, the Legislative Yuan voted to waive immunity and permit Tsai's arrest. In March 1985, the magazine Thunder reported that Tsai had bribed Kuomintang officials to obtain a legislative nomination from the party. Tsai was sentenced to fifteen years imprisonment of charges of fraud in April 1985. Due to the extent of his actions, the longest possible sentence was 1,582 years. Tangwai publications extensively covered the legal action against Tsai, alongside the murder of Henry Liu, inciting the Kuomintang to confiscate Tangwai publications. Tsai Wan-lin gave Tsai Chen-chou a one-time $7.5 million loan over the course of the scandal, but would not help him further. Tsai Chen-chou died in prison in 1987, of liver disease. Following the arrest of David Chou in 2003, the Taipei Times noted that Tsai and Huang Hsin-chieh were the only legislators to have been jailed during the authoritarian Kuomintang era.

References

1946 births
1987 deaths
Taipei Members of the Legislative Yuan
Kuomintang Members of the Legislative Yuan in Taiwan
Members of the 1st Legislative Yuan in Taiwan
Tsai family of Miaoli
20th-century Taiwanese businesspeople
Politicians of the Republic of China on Taiwan from Miaoli County
Taiwanese business executives
Taiwanese politicians convicted of fraud
Taiwanese people who died in prison custody
Prisoners who died in Taiwanese detention
Taiwanese bankers